Carbonatobis(ethylenediamine)cobalt(III) chloride is a salt with the formula [CoCO3(en)2]Cl (en = ethylenediamine). It is a red diamagnetic solid that is soluble in water. It is the monochloride salt of the cationic coordination complex [CoCO3(en)2]+.  The chloride ion in this salt readily undergoes ion exchange.  The compound is synthesized by the oxidation of a mixture of cobalt(II) chloride, lithium hydroxide, and ethylenediamine in the presence of carbon dioxide:
CoCl2 + 2 en + CO2 + 0.5H2O2 +  LiOH  →   [CoCO3(en)2]Cl  +  H2O  +  LiCl

The cationic complex is octahedral with C2 symmetry.

The carbonato ligand is readily replaced upon acid hydrolysis.  Derivatives include the following complexes: cis- and trans-[CoCl2(en)2]+,  cis-[Co(OH)(H2O)3(en)2]2+,  cis-[Co(OH2)2(en)2]+,  and cis-[Co(NO2)2(en)2]+.  Reaction with trifluoromethanesulfonic acid (HOTf) gives  [Co(OTf)2(en)2]OTf.

References

Chlorides
Cobalt complexes
Cobalt(III) compounds
Ethylenediamine complexes
Metal halides
Carbonates